Almåsgrønningen is a lake in the municipality of Høylandet in Trøndelag county, Norway.

See also
List of lakes in Norway

References

Lakes of Trøndelag
Høylandet